Heliotrope Studios was a video game developer active in the 1990s. Heliotrope was started as Changeling Software in 1990, a Macintosh developer, by Andrew and Peter Sispoidis, then changed its name when it began cross-platform development. The company developed Pax Imperia and Pax Imperia: Eminent Domain.

References

External links 

American companies established in 1990
Video game companies established in 1990
Defunct video game companies of the United States
Video game development companies
Defunct companies based in Connecticut
Software companies based in Connecticut
Apple Design Awards recipients